Ibiza is a Spanish geographical indication for Vino de la Tierra wines located in the autonomous region of the Balearic Islands, Spain. Vino de la Tierra is one step below the mainstream Denominación de Origen indication on the Spanish wine quality ladder.

The area covered by this geographical indication comprises all the municipalities of the island of Ibiza. There are currently about 35 hectares of vineyards, spread over a large part of the island and 5 wineries (known as bodegas in Spanish) registered with the Regulatory Council.

It acquired its Vino de la Tierra status in 1996.

Grape varieties
 Red: Monastrell, Tempranillo, Cabernet sauvignon, Merlot and Syrah
 White: Macabeo, Parellada, Malvasía, Chardonnay and Moscatel

References

External links
 Vino de la tierra de Formentera Página del Institut de Qualitat Agroalimentaria de las Islas Baleares

Spanish wine
Wine regions of Spain
Appellations
Cuisine of Ibiza